Halle André Vacheresse is an indoor sporting arena located in Roanne, France.  The capacity of the arena is 5,020 people.  It is currently home to the Chorale Roanne Basket basketball team.

References

Indoor arenas in France
Basketball venues in France
Sports venues in Loire (department)
Sport in Roanne